The 1996 World Men's Curling Championship (branded as 1996 Ford World Men's Curling Championship for sponsorship reasons) was held at Copps Coliseum in Hamilton, Ontario, Canada from March 23–31, 1996.

Teams

Round-robin standings

Round-robin results

Draw 1

Draw 2

Draw 3

Draw 4

Draw 5

Draw 6

Draw 7

Draw 8

Draw 9

Tiebreakers

Round 1

Round 2

Playoffs

Final

References
 

World Men's Curling Championship
Curling
Ford World Mens Curling Championship, 1996
Curling in Ontario
International curling competitions hosted by Canada
Ford World Men's Curling Championship 
Sports competitions in Hamilton, Ontario
20th century in Hamilton, Ontario